KMPK (96.7 FM) is a radio station broadcasting an adult contemporary format. Licensed to McPherson, Kansas, United States, the station is currently owned by Ad Astra per Aspera Broadcasting, Inc.

History
The station was first licensed as KNEX-FM on July 17, 1975. On January 1, 1984, the station changed its call sign to KBBE.

In April 2022, Davies Communications, which had owned KBBE and sister station KNGL since 1985, announced they would sell the station to Hutchinson-based Ad Astra per Aspera Broadcasting. Upon closing of the sale on May 31, KBBE's classic hits format moved to KNGL and its FM translator K255DK (98.9 FM); concurrently, KBBE flipped to adult contemporary as "Mix 96.7". On June 14, KBBE changed call letters to KMPK. Mornings on the station are locally hosted by Tammie Henson, with programming for the remainder of the day coming from Westwood One's "Adult Contemporary" format.

References

External links

MPK
Radio stations established in 1975
1975 establishments in Kansas
Mainstream adult contemporary radio stations in the United States